Pentamycin, also called fungichromin, is a macrolide antimicrobial.
Pentamycin is a polyene antifungal antibiotic obtained from Streptomyces pentaticus. It is used in the treatment of vaginal candidiasis, for the protozoal infection trichomoniasis, and mixed infections. A 3 mg vaginal pessary is inserted once or twice daily for 5-10 days. It is also used to treat pulmonary aspergillosis as a dry powder inhalation system.

References 

Macrolide antibiotics
Polyenes